Mounteer is a surname that probably originated in Cornwall, England.

Early Mounteers
The origins of the name can be traced back to:

England

1. Richard Mounteer (or Monter) died in Leatherhead, Surrey, England, in September 1488.  He was married to Joan (died 1489).  His son John Mounteer died March 3, 1569, in Merstham, Surrey, and daughter Frances died February 24, 1563, in Merstham, Surrey.

2. Richard Mounteer (otherwise Mounteere, Mountier, Munter or Mounter), a cathedral musician, living in Canterbury, England between 1638-1646.  He was married to Katharine (died 1679) and had daughters Sara (August 12, 1641, and died same day), Ellyn (born September 25, 1642), Tamosin (January 28, 1644 - September 11, 1645), and Anne (born September 12, 1646), and a son Richard (January 26, 1648 - March 17, 1650).

3. Thomas Mounteer of St. Mary Magdalen, Bermondsey, England, on board the ship John and Mary on November 11, 1681.

4. Alis Mounteer (Mounteere) married Henry Bernard on February 12, 1684, in Wiltshire, England.

5. Anthony Mounteer, a mariner living in Liverpool, Lancashire, England, in 1749.  He married Margaret on January 22, 1746, at St. Peter's Church, formerly located on Church Street, Liverpool.

US

1. Henry Mounteer (or Mounteere), a tanner, living in Northampton County, Virginia, United States on October 28, 1679.  He was an indentured servant of John Stinger.

2. James Mounteer (or Mounteere, Montare, Montier, or Mountier), an innkeeper, owned five acres of land in Boston, Massachusetts Bay Colony, between 1687 and 1695.  He was apparently from France, coming to Boston with his wife and an English maid. He acted as security for Daniell Bernardo on October 31, 1701, in Boston.   In 1707 and 1709, he applied to sell liquor as a retailer.  He was probably an innkeeper between 1712 and 1717, as records show that he petitioned for a licence to sell liquor at an inn.  In 1719 he was granted permission to sell liquor from his house on King Street, Boston.

3. William Mounteer (Mountere or Mountier), a tavern keeper, living in Middlesex County, New Jersey, in the Thirteen Colonies, between 1748 and 1767.  William Mountere or Mountier was living in Princeton, New Jersey, in the summer of 1748, in a house which he rented from Judge Thomas Leonard, at £20 per annum, and was building a house in Middlesex County, New Jersey, on a lot of his own, on the other side of the Street, which he was occupying in February, 1730–51. He advertised the place for sale in September, 1753, describing the lot as "containing three acres, subject to Five Pounds a year ground rent, the house is new and well finished, and very convenient for a tavern (one being kept in it now), or any other public business, being well situated, and near where the college is to be built." He was then living in Trenton, New Jersey. He was probably a tavern keeper. He seems to have been again occupying the premises in 1761, and as late as 1767.

4. Phoebe Mounteer (otherwise Phebe Monteer) born in New Jersey, United States March 3, 1744, and died in Mason County, Kentucky, United States in 1818.  Her father may be Luke Montier or William Mountere.

Barbados

1. Robert Mounteer (or Mounter), living in Barbados in 1653. He owned twelve acres of land in St. Thomas Parish, Barbados and 5 slaves in 1679.  He may have been the father of John Mounteer.

2. John Mounteer (probably Mounter, Mountere, or Montier), a soldier, living in Barbados in 1679. His father was probably Robert Mounter, and his son may have been James Mounteer.

3. James Mounteer (probably Mounter, Mountere, or Montier), a mariner, living in Saint Michael, Barbados in 1717.  He married Anne Hampleton (probably a spelling of Hamilton) on February 12, 1719, in St. James Parish, Barbados.  James Mounteer was the captain of the Prosperity of Glasgow, a ship that traded goods between Glasgow, Scotland, and Virginia, United States, in 1732, and the Pelican of Saltcoats, a ship that traded goods between Saltcoats, Scotland, and Barbados in 1734.

Possible connections

Anthony Mounteer may be the son of James Mounteer.  James Mounteer is the earliest recorded person with the spelling Mounteer, Anthony was the second.  Anthony was probably born about 1725.  At this time James Mounteer was captain of a ship taking goods between Scotland and Barbados, a route that would have included Liverpool.  By 1746, Anthony was working as a mariner.  In addition, Anthony named his second son John and his third son James.  John Mounter was James Mounteer's father, which would make him Anthony Mounteer's grandfather.

Notable people with the surname "Mounteer"
Robert Mounteer - a charter member of the Migisi Opawgan Lodge of the Great Lakes Council (Boy Scouts of America)
Jules Mounteer - member of Captain Tractor
Tom Mounteer - chairman of the board of directors, Federal City Performing Arts Association
Donald Edwin Mounteer – brigadier general, Canadian Forces
Bill Mounteer - engineer at Lendio

References

Surnames